Shahsavan Kandi Rural District is a rural district (dehestan) in the Central District of Saveh County, Markazi Province, Iran. At the 2006 census, its population was 1,537, in 556 families. The rural district has 32 villages.

References 

Rural Districts of Markazi Province
Saveh County